Francis Hutchinson  (1703–1768)  was an Anglican priest in Ireland during the 18th century.

Hutchinson was born in County Down and  educated at Trinity College, Dublin. He was Archdeacon of Down from 1733 until his death.

Notes

Alumni of Trinity College Dublin
Archdeacons of Down
18th-century Irish Anglican priests
1768 deaths
1703 births
Christian clergy from County Down